An aircraft safety card is a document instructing passengers on an aircraft about the procedures for dealing with various emergency conditions that might arise during the flight.

General information

The safety cards are usually provided by airlines on all commercial flights, usually located in the back of the seat in front of each passenger, or alternatively a placard on the back of seats. Pre-flight safety demonstrations, either conducted by the flight attendants or through a video presentation, instruct passengers to familiarize themselves with the safety cards prior to take-off. 

The cards are frequently laminated or made of plastic and contain instructions that are specific to the model of the airplane in which they are found. The contents are usually in the form of pictures, graphically illustrating such procedures as buckling the seat belts, bracing for impact in an airplane crash, dealing with depressurization, opening the emergency exit door or inflating life rafts in the event of a water landing. The graphic representation allows the cards to be accessible to those speaking a different language from the flight attendants, as well as to children and illiterate passengers. Braille cards are also offered on many mainstream airlines.

Collectibles
Aircraft safety cards are a collectible item among the aviation enthusiast community since they are a reflection of an airline, an aircraft type, a culture, and a historical period. Safety cards are collected from civil and military aircraft, rare cards have been known to fetch over US$1000 at auction.

See also
 Emergency aircraft evacuation
 Inflight magazine
 Sickness bag

References

Aircraft components
Aviation safety
Emergency aircraft operations
Safety equipment
Handbooks and manuals
Ephemera